Geoff Parry (born 1953) is an Australian former actor. He is perhaps best known to film viewers for his role as Bubba Zanetti, the blond-haired lieutenant of the outlaw motorcycle gang, in Mad Max. He has also been credited under the name Geoff Perry in other works.

Partial filmography
 Division 4 (1973-1975, TV Series) - Simon Smith / Bill Trent / Sammy James / Mike Collins / Ian Kruger / Cyril White
 Rush (1974, TV Series) - Bennett
 Chopper Squad (1978, TV Series) - Brian Jarvis
 Mad Max (1979) - Bubba Zanetti
 Gallipoli (1981) - Sgt. Sayers
 Women of the Sun (1982, TV Mini-Series) - Mr. Watson
 The Clinic (1982) - Charlie
 Prisoner (1980–1983, TV Series) - George Goscombe / Thug
 Melvin, Son of Alvin (1984) - Science teacher
 A Thousand Skies (1985, TV Mini-Series) - Bob Hitchcock
 Sword of Honour (1986, TV Mini-Series) - Major Sincock
 Death of a Soldier (1986) - GI at hanging
 The Big Hurt (1986) - Mr. Gregg

References

External links
 

1953 births
Australian male actors
Living people